This is a list of schools in Charlotte, North Carolina and its metropolitan area.

Higher education 
Includes schools throughout the Charlotte Metropolitan Area.

Public schools

High schools 
Ardrey Kell High School
Charlotte Mecklenburg Virtual High School
David W. Butler High School
East Mecklenburg High School  
Garinger High School
Harding University High School
Hopewell High School
Independence High School
Julius L. Chambers High School
Mallard Creek High School
Myers Park High School
North Mecklenburg High School
Northwest School of the Arts
Olympic High School
Phillip O. Berry Academy of Technology
Providence High School
Rocky River High School
South Mecklenburg High School
West Charlotte High School
West Mecklenburg High School
William A. Hough High School

Middle schools 
Albemarle Road Middle School
Alexander Graham Middle School
Bailey Middle School
Bishop Spaugh Middle School
Carmel Middle School
Cochrane Collegiate Academy
Community House Middle School
Coulwood Middle School
Crestdale Middle School
Davidson IB Middle School
Eastway Middle School
Francis Bradley Middle School
J. M. Alexander Middle School
J. T. Williams Middle School
James Martin Middle School
Jay M. Robinson Middle School
Kennedy Middle School
Marie G. Davis Middle School
Martin Luther King Jr. Middle School
McClintock Middle School
Metrolina Regional Scholars Academy
Mint Hill Middle School
Northridge Middle School
Northwest School of the Arts
Piedmont Open IB Middle School
Quail Hollow Middle School
Randolph Middle School
Ranson Middle School
Ridge Road Middle School
Sedgefield Middle School
South Academy of International Languages
South Charlotte Middle School
Southwest Middle School
Wilson STEM Academy

Elementary schools 
Albemarle Road Elementary School
Allenbrook Elementary School
Amay James Pre-K School
Ashley Park Elementary School
Bain Elementary School
Ballantyne Elementary School
Berryhill Elementary School
Barnette Elementary School
Beverly Woods Elementary School
Billingsville Elementary School
Blythe Elementary School
Briarwood Elementary School
Bruns Avenue Elementary School
Chantilly Montessori Elementary School
Charles H. Parker Academic Center
Clear Creek Elementary School
Collinswood Language Academy
Cornelius Elementary School
Cotswold Elementary School
Crown Point Elementary School
David Cox Road Elementary School
Davidson Elementary School
Devonshire Elementary School
Dilworth Elementary School
Double Oaks Pre-K School
Druid Hills Academy
Eastover Elementary School
Elizabeth Traditional Elementary School
Elon Park Elementary School
Endhaven Elementary School
Governor's Village STEM Academy
Greenway Park Elementary School
Hawk Ridge Elementary School
Hickory Grove Elementary School
First Ward Creative Arts Academy
Highland Mill Montessori Elementary School
Hidden Valley Elementary School
Highland Renaissance Academy
Hornets Nest Elementary School
Huntersville Elementary School
Huntingtowne Farms Elementary School
Idlewild Elementary School
Irwin Academic Center
J. H. Gunn Elementary School
Joseph W. Grier Academy
Lake Wylie Elementary School
Lansdowne Elementary School
Lebanon Road Elementary School
Lincoln Heights Elementary School
Long Creek Elementary School
Mallard Creek Elementary School
Matthews Elementary School
McAlpine Elementary School
McKee Road Elementary School
Merry Oaks Elementary School
Metrolina Regional Scholars Academy
Montclaire Elementary School
Mountain Island Elementary School
Myers Park Traditional Elementary School
Nations Ford Elementary School
Nathaniel Alexander Elementary School
Newell Elementary School
Oakdale Elementary School
Oakhurst Elementary School
Oaklawn Language Academy
Olde Providence Elementary School
Park Road Montessori School
Paw Creek Elementary School
Pawtuckett Elementary School
Pineville Elementary School
Piney Grove Elementary School
Polo Ridge Elementary School
Plaza Road Pre-K School
Providence Spring Elementary School
Rama Road Elementary School
Reedy Creek Elementary School
Reid Park Academy
River Gate Elementary School
River Oaks Academy
Sedgefield Elementary School
Selwyn Elementary School
Shamrock Gardens Elementary School
Sharon Elementary School
Smithfield Elementary School
Starmount Pre-K School
Statesville Road Elementary School
Steele Creek Elementary School
Sterling Elementary School
Thomasboro Academy
Torrence Creek Elementary School
Tryon Hills Pre-K School
Tuckaseegee Elementary School
University Meadows Elementary School
University Park Creative Arts School
Villa Heights Elementary School
South Academy of International Languages
Walter G. Byers School
Wesley Chapel Elementary School
Westerly Hills Academy
Winding Springs Elementary School
Windsor Park Elementary School
Winget Park Elementary School
Winterfield Elementary School

Alternative and Exceptional schools 
Amay James Alternative School
Cato Middle College High School 
Charlotte-Mecklenburg Academy
Hawthorne Academy of Health Sciences
Lincoln Heights Academy
Metro School
Midwood High School
Morgan School
Morningside at Graham Alternative School
Turning Point Academy

Private schools 
Adventist Christian Academy 
Back Creek Christian Academy
Berean Junior Academy
Bible Baptist Christian School
British School of Charlotte
Carmel Christian School
Charlotte Catholic High School
Charlotte Christian School
Charlotte Country Day School
Charlotte Islamic Academy
Charlotte Jewish Day School
Charlotte Latin School
Charlotte Preparatory School
Charlotte United Christian Academy
Countryside Montessori School
Covenant Day School
Dore Academy
The Fletcher School
Grace Academy
Grace Covenant Academy
Greyfriars Classical Academy
Hickory Grove Christian School
Holy Trinity Catholic Middle School
Hope Academy
Northside Christian Academy
Our Lady of the Assumption Catholic School (PK-8)
Providence Christian School
Providence Day School
Resurrection Christian School
St. Ann Catholic School (PK-5)
St. Gabriel Catholic School (K-5)
St. Matthew Catholic School (TK-5)
St. Patrick Catholic School (K-5)
Southlake Christian Academy
Trinity Episcopal School
Trinity Christian Preparatory School
United Faith Christian Academy
Victory Christian Center School
Word of Wisdom in Excellence Academy

Charter schools 
Bradford Preparatory School
Charlotte Secondary School
Community Charter School
Community School of Davidson
Corvian Community School
Crossroads Charter High School
Kennedy Charter Public School
KIPP Academy Charlotte
Langtree Charter Academy
Lake Norman Charter School
Metrolina Regional Scholars Academy
Mountain Island Charter School
Pioneer Springs Community School
Socrates Academy
Sugar Creek Charter School
VERITAS Community School
Queen's Grant High School
Queen's Grant Community School

 
Charlotte